Damilola Emuze is a Nigerian businessperson, co-founder and Chief Operating Officer of ScholarX, a platform which connects high-potential students with funding opportunities.

In December 2019, Emuze was one of five female entrepreneurs to emerge as winners of a UK-Nigeria Tech Hub competition sponsored by the British High Commission in Lagos. The winners received sponsorship to travel to the United Kingdom for the January 2020 UK-Africa Investment Summit. In March 2020 Emuze was one of ten African entrepreneurs selected for the Westerwelle Young Founders Programme, a six-month programme for entrepreneurs from developing and emerging economies.

References

Year of birth missing (living people)
Living people
Nigerian technology businesspeople
Nigerian women in business